Kalon Oros is  one of the mountains in the North West of Cephalonia Height 901m

References

Mountains of Greece
Landforms of Cephalonia
Mountains of the Ionian Islands (region)